Danny Maun (born 5 January 1981, in Dewsbury, England) is an English former rugby league footballer. Maun plays for Hunslet Hawks in the Co-operative Championship 1. He previously played at Wigan, Featherstone Rovers and Dewsbury Rams.and Most notably Batley Bulldogs where he remains a fan favourite and playing 254 games.

Danny Maun began his professional rugby career at Wigan Warriors before signing with Batley. In 2006 Maun won the Division 2 championship with Dewsbury and also in 2010 he won the northern rail cup with Batley and appeared in the 2013 Grand final Championship with the Batley Bulldogs. Maun re-signed with Batley for the 2008 season and in the 2010 season went on to win the Northern Rail Cup against Widnes Vikings 25-24. As of 2 October 2013, Danny Maun at the age of 32 registered with Hunslet Hawks who were just recently relegated to Kingstone Press Championship 1.

Honours 
[2003 Dream team]
National League Two Runners-Up: 2005, with Dewsbury Rams
National League Two Champions: 2006, with Dewsbury Rams
Northern Rail Cup Champions: 2010, with Batley Bulldogs
Kingstone Press Championship Grand Final Runners Up: 2013, with Batley Bulldogs
Dream team selection 2003
Championship 1 Grand final winner 2014 Hunslet Hawks

References

1981 births
Living people
Batley Bulldogs players
Dewsbury Rams players
English rugby league players
Featherstone Rovers players
Hunslet R.L.F.C. players
Rugby league centres
Rugby league players from Dewsbury